The 9th NACAC Under-23 Championships in Athletics were held at Jorge "El Magico" Gonzalez National Stadium in San Salvador, El Salvador from July 15–17, 2016.

Medal summary

Medal winners and complete results can be found.

Men

Women

Medal table (unofficial)

Participation
According to an unofficial count, 305 athletes from 28 nations participated. The only eligible countries not participating were Dominica, Grenada, and Saint Lucia.

 (1)
 (4)
 (2)
 (14)
 (9)
 (8)
 (2)
 (7)
 (32)
 (1)
 (18)
 (9)
 (8)
 (2)
 (1)
 (12)
 (32)
 (9)
 (1)
 (2)
 (8)
 (5)
 (4)
 (25)
 (11)
 (1)
 (75)
 (2)

References

External links
 Meet Results

NACAC Under-23 Championships in Athletics
Sports competitions in San Salvador
NACAC U23 Championshis
NACAC U23 Championshis
International athletics competitions hosted by El Salvador
2016 in youth sport